"Love Circles" is the second and final single released from Squeeze's eighth album, Frank. It featured a rare lead vocal turn by Squeeze lyricist Chris Difford – the only other Squeeze single on which Difford sang lead throughout the entire track was 1979's "Cool for Cats".

Track listing

7" vinyl
 "Love Circles" (4:25)
 "Red Light" (4:19)

12" vinyl and CD
 "Love Circles" (4:25)
 "Red Light" (4:19)
 "Who's That?" (2:39)

External links
Squeeze discography at Squeezenet

Squeeze (band) songs
1990 singles
Songs written by Glenn Tilbrook
Songs written by Chris Difford
1989 songs
A&M Records singles